Sheffield City Council elections took place on Thursday 4 May 2006 with polling stations open between 7am and 10pm. One third of council seats were up for election; one in each ward, plus one additional seat in Ecclesall due to a resignation. The overall turnout this year was 34.5%, down considerably from the previous year's general election turnout at 43.9 per cent turnout in Sheffield.

Councillors before and after the election

Election result

This result has the following consequences for the total number of seats on the Council after the elections:

Ward results

Arbourthorne

Beauchief & Greenhill

Beighton

Birley

Broomhill

Burngreave

Central

Crookes

Darnall

Dore & Totley

East Ecclesfield

Ecclesall

Firth Park

Fulwood

Gleadless Valley

Graves Park

Hillsborough

Manor Castle

Mosborough

Nether Edge

Richmond

Shiregreen & Brightside

Southey

Stannington

Stocksbridge & Upper Don

Walkley

West Ecclesfield

Woodhouse

References

2006 English local elections
2006
2000s in Sheffield